Emily Colas is an American author.  Her book Just Checking: Scenes From the Life of an Obsessive-Compulsive illustrates her struggle with obsessive-compulsive disorder (OCD), and the effects it had on her life and family. She lives in Los Angeles.

References

External links 
 Reading guide and author interview

Year of birth missing (living people)
Living people
American memoirists
American biographers
American women memoirists
21st-century American women